Francis Obeng (born 7 February 1986) is a Ghanaian footballer who plays for Santarcangelo.

Biography
Born in Tema, Ghana, Obeng was a player of Santarcangelo since 2008. He followed the team promoted from Serie D to Lega Pro Seconda Divisione in 2011. He was also signed by Carpi in co-ownership deal in July 2011; In June 2012 Carpi acquired him outright. Obeng returned to Santarcangelo in temporary deal again on 31 August 2012 and on 16 July 2013.

On 30 January 2014 Obeng was signed by A.S. Roma in order to exploit his non-EU status for non-EU signing quota of Roma.

References

External links
 AIC profile (data by football.it) 
 Profile at LaSerieD.com 
 

1986 births
People from Tema
Living people
Ghanaian footballers
Santarcangelo Calcio players
A.S. Melfi players
Serie C players
Serie D players
Association football midfielders
Ghanaian expatriate footballers
Expatriate footballers in Italy
Ghanaian expatriate sportspeople in Italy